Transition layer may refer to: 
 In mathematics, a mathematical approach to finding an accurate approximation to a problem's solution.
 In aviation, a region of airspace between the transition altitude and the transition level.